Bigga can refer to the following:

Places
 Bigga, New South Wales, a village in Australia
 Bigga, Shetland, an island in Scotland

Organisations
 B.I.G.G.A., British and International Golf Greenkeepers Association
 Bigga, a Jamaican cream soda

See also
 Biggar (disambiguation)